FC Barcelona Bàsquet B (English: FC Barcelona Basketball B), commonly referred to as FC Barcelona B and colloquially known as Barça B, is the reserve team of the FC Barcelona. The team currently plays in the Spanish 3rd-tier level LEB Plata.

History 
In 2003, Barcelona B won the amateur Spanish 4th-tier level Liga EBA, and thus got promoted to the LEB 2 division, but afterwards, they renounced their spot. After an agreement between FC Barcelona and CB Cornellà, for Cornellà to collaborate again as a reserve team of FC Barcelona; the 'B' team was folded by Barcelona, between 2005 and 2010. In 2010, FC Barcelona B was re-opened, and played in the LEB Plata division.

The team then played in the Spanish 2nd-tier level LEB Oro division, from 2012, when the team gained a vacant berth in the

Players

Current roster

Depth chart

Season by season

Trophies and awards

Trophies 
Liga EBA: (1)
2003

Individual awards 
LEB Oro Rising star
Mario Hezonja – 2013
Marc García – 2016

References

External links 
Official website
FC Barcelona B at FEB.es

 
Catalan basketball teams
LEB Plata teams